The Infinix Hot S3 is an Android smartphone manufactured by Infinix Mobile.
This phone was released in India in February 2018. It has a 13 MP rear camera and a 20 MP front camera. It has a 4000 mAh battery.

Specifications

Hardware
The Infinix Hot S3 has a 5.7 inch IPS LCD display with 720 x 1440 pixel resolution. It has pixel density of ~282 ppi. The phone measures 153 mm x 72.9 mm x 8.4 mm. It is powered by Qualcomm Snapdragon 430 soc. It has Octa-core 1.4 GHz Cortex-A53 CPU and Adreno 505 GPU. It comes with 3 GB RAM and 32 GB internal storage. It has 4000 mAh lithium polymer battery.

Cameras
The Infinix Hot S3 has a 13 MP rear camera. It also has a 20 MP front camera. Both the cameras can record video in 1080p in 30fps.

Software
The Infinix Hot S3 comes preinstalled with Android 8.1(Oreo).

Design
The Infinix Hot S3 comes in Blush Gold, Sandstone Black, Topaz Blue, Bordeaux Red and Brush Gold colors.

References

Android (operating system) devices
Mobile phones introduced in 2018
Infinix smartphones